Recaredo Castillo of Bislig City High School Inc. (RCBCHSI), formerly Recaredo Castillo College (RCC), is a private educational institution established in 1967. It is located in Gamaon District, Mangagoy, Bislig, Surigao del Sur in the Philippines. The school is named after Recaredo Castillo, former mayor of Bislig. It offers junior high school, senior high school, TESDA-accredited vocational courses and previously elementary school and college courses.

Footnotes 
http://www.bislig.gov.ph/content_links.php?submenu_id=57&menu_id=3&subcategory_id=6
http://www.bislig.gov.ph/news_list_public.php?news_id=12

References 
 Recaredo Castillo of Bislig City High School Inc. website
 
Recaredo Castillo of Bislig City High School Inc. official active Facebook account

Universities and colleges in Surigao del Sur
Schools in Surigao del Sur
Education in Bislig
Educational institutions established in 1967
High schools in the Philippines
Private schools in the Philippines